Flurbiprofen is a member of the phenylalkanoic acid derivative family of nonsteroidal anti-inflammatory drugs (NSAIDs). It is primarily indicated as a pre-operative anti-miotic (in an ophthalmic solution) as well as orally for arthritis or dental pain. Side effects are analogous to those of ibuprofen.

It was derived from propionic acid by the research arm of Boots UK during the 1960s, a period which also included the discovery of ibuprofen, indometacin, diclofenac, naproxen, ketoprofen, and sulindac.

It was patented in 1964 by Boots UK and approved for medical use in 1987. It was approved in the US in 1988; the first generic was approved in 1994.

Adverse effects 

In October 2020, the U.S. Food and Drug Administration (FDA) required the drug label to be updated for all nonsteroidal anti-inflammatory medications to describe the risk of kidney problems in unborn babies that result in low amniotic fluid. They recommend avoiding NSAIDs in pregnant women at 20 weeks or later in pregnancy.

Society and culture

Brand names
As of 2016 the drug was available worldwide as drops for ophthalmic use and as tablets, both in various strengths, under many brand names which include: Acustop Cataplasma, Adofeed, Anazin, Anflupin, Anorcid, Ansaid, Antadys, Antafen, Antipain, Baenazin, Benactiv, Biprofin, Biprotec, Bro-Z, Brufen, Brufoz, Cebutid, Clinadol, Coryfin, Dispain, Edolfene, Eyeflur, Falken, Fiera, Flu Ro Fen, Flubifix, Flufen, Flugalin, Flupe, Flur di fen, Fluractive, Fluran, Flurbi Pap, Flurbic, Flurbiprofen, Flurbiprofène, Flurbiprofeno, Flurflex, Flurofen, Fluroptic, Fo Bi Pu Luo Fun, Forphen, Fortine, Froben, Frolix, Fubifen, Fubiprofen, Fubofen, Fukon, Fulruban, Furofen, Kai Fen, Kavoflog, Kotton, Lefenine, Majezik, Maprofen, Maxaljin, Maximus, Meiprofen, Neliacan, Nibelon, Nirolex Gola, Ocufen, Ocuflur, Optifen, Orofaringeo, Painil, Profen, Projezik, Ropion, Sigmaprofen, Stayban, Strefen, Strepfen, Strepflam, Strepsils (various formulations), Sulan, Tie Shr Shu, TransAct, Upnon, Urbifen, Yakuban, Zepolas, Zeralgo, Zero-P, and Zeton.

Synthesis
Patent quotation: "It has anti-inflammatory activity which is about 240 times that of aspirin and analgesic activity which is about 180 times that of aspirin in standard laboratory tests."

The Malonic ester synthesis between 2,4-Difluoronitrobenzene [446-35-5] (1) and Diethyl methylmalonate [609-08-5] (2) gives Diethyl (3-fluoro-4-nitrophenyl)methylmalonate [78543-06-3] (3). The catalytic hydrogenation of the nitro group gives Diethyl (4-amino-3-fluorophenyl)methylmalonate [78543-08-5] (4). Sandmeyer reaction of the diazonium salt with benzene (5) apparently gives CID:13065233 (6). Saponification of the esters gives 2-(2-Fluorobiphenyl-4-yl)-2,3-dimethylbutanedioic acid [42771-82-4] (7). Boiling in acid causes decarboxylation, completing the synthesis of Flurbiprofen (8).

References

Further reading 
 

Nonsteroidal anti-inflammatory drugs
Fluoroarenes
Phenyl alkanoic acids
Propionic acids